The Audie Award for Spanish Language Title is one of the Audie Awards presented annually by the Audio Publishers Association (APA). It awards excellence in narration, production, and content for a Spanish-language audiobook released in a given year. The award was discontinued in 2011, having been presented since 2007, but it has been restored since the 26th Audie Awards in 2021.

Winners and finalists

2007-2010

2020s

References

External links 

 Audie Award winners
 Audie Awards official website

Spanish Language